Dove vai tutta nuda?, internationally released as Where Are You Going All Naked?, is a 1969 Italian comedy film directed by Pasquale Festa Campanile.

Cast 
 Maria Grazia Buccella: Tonino
 Tomas Milian: Manfredo
 Gastone Moschin: President
 Vittorio Gassman: Rufus Conforti
 Angela Luce: Prostitute
 Giancarlo Badessi: Waiter  
 Lea Lander: President's Wife

References

External links

1969 films
Italian comedy films
1969 comedy films
Films directed by Pasquale Festa Campanile
Films scored by Armando Trovajoli
Films set in Rome
Films shot in Rome
Films set in London
1960s Italian-language films
1960s Italian films